La Losa is a municipality located in the province of Segovia, Castile and León, Spain. According to the 2004 census (INE), the municipality has a population of 445 inhabitants. La Losa is a small town that has a bakery, a small shop, a small doctor and pharmacy, along with a summer school and public library.

References

Municipalities in the Province of Segovia